CA-15 may refer to:
CAC CA-15, an aircraft
, a ship
California State Route 15, a road
California's 15th congressional district